Nawabzada Agha Mohammad Raza was a Pakistani general in Pakistan Army and diplomat who served as an ambassador of Pakistan to China, France, and the United States.

Military and diplomatic career
He was trained at the Royal Military Academy in England and served as an Indian Government official before the Partition of British India in 1947. After the partition, the Pakistan Army appointed him as Adjutant General, making him responsible for restructuring the army.

He served as the Ambassador of Pakistan to China from 1951 - 1954 and 1962 - 1966. He also served as the Ambassador of Pakistan to Iran, Ambassador of Pakistan to France, Ambassador of Pakistan to Italy and Ambassador of Pakistan to the US.

Death
He was admitted into Capital Hospital 12 June 1984 after he had a heart attack. He seemed to be recovering but four days later on 16 June 1984 he had another heart attack which proved fatal, causing him to die at the age of 79.

References

1984 deaths
Pakistani generals
Ambassadors of Pakistan to the United States
Ambassadors of Pakistan to China
Ambassadors of Pakistan to France
Ambassadors of Pakistan to Italy
Ambassadors of Pakistan to Iran
1905 births